JumpAround may refer to:
 Jump Around, the House of Pain song.
 JumpAround, the inflatable bounce houses.
 The Fresh Beat Band, The JumpArounds was their original name until 2009.
 Jump Around, an EP by rapper and YouTube personality KSI